The National Revolutionary Martyrs' Shrine is a shrine in Zhongshan District, Taipei, Taiwan, dedicated to the war dead of the Republic of China.

Built on Chingshan Mountain and overseeing the Keelung River in Taipei's Zhongshan District in 1969, the Martyrs' Shrine recalls the architecture of the Hall of Supreme Harmony in Beijing's Forbidden City. The structure houses the spirit tablets of about 390,000 persons killed, among other engagements, during the Xinhai Revolution, Northern Expedition, Second Sino-Japanese War, Chinese Civil War, and the First and Second Taiwan Strait Crises. A changing of the honor guard from the various branches of the Republic of China Military, similar to the rituals at the Sun Yat-sen Memorial Hall and Chiang Kai-shek Memorial Hall, take place at the shrine.

The Martyrs' Shrine was the site of the funeral of Chiang Ching-kuo in 1988. On March 29 (Youth Day, commemorating the Huanghuagang Uprising) and September 3 (Armed Forces Day) of every year the President of the Republic of China leads the heads of the five Yuans (branches of government) to pay their respects to the martyrs by bowing and offering incense. Similar shrines are located in each locality in Taiwan, and similar ceremonies are led by county magistrates and city mayors.

Although the Martyrs' Shrine is located in Taiwan, most of the soldiers were born in mainland China. Taiwan was ruled by Japan throughout World War II, and about 200,000 Taiwanese who lived under Japanese rule served in the Japanese Imperial Army or Navy.

Following a 1998 legal amendment, people who were not affiliated with the military could be inducted into the shrine. Several police officers and firefighters who have died in the line of duty have also been commemorated at the shrine, including Yang Chi-chang, who died in the Taiwan McDonald's bombings. Healthcare workers on duty during the Hoping Hospital lockdown of the 2003 SARS outbreak have also been inducted. Wen Yung-nan, who died in 1973 while delivering mail in the aftermath of Typhoon Nora, was the first postal worker to be inducted.

Transport
The shrine is accessible within walking distance West from Dazhi Station of the Taipei Metro.

See also
 Kaohsiung Martyrs' Shrine
 Taichung Martyrs' Shrine
 List of tourist attractions in Taiwan

References

External link
 

1969 establishments in Taiwan
Buildings and structures in Taipei
Martyrs' shrines in Taiwan
Military monuments and memorials
Military of the Republic of China
Tourist attractions in Taipei